Ronald Gene Dunn (born June 1, 1953) is an American country music singer-songwriter and record executive.  Starting in 2011, Dunn has worked as a solo artist following the temporary dissolution of Brooks & Dunn. He released his self-titled debut album for Arista Nashville on June 7, 2011, reaching the Top 10 with its lead-off single "Bleed Red". In 2013, after leaving Arista Nashville in 2012, Dunn founded Little Will-E Records. On April 8, 2014, Ronnie Dunn released his second solo album, Peace, Love, and Country Music through his Little Will-E Records. On November 11, 2016, he released his third album Tattooed Heart on NASH Icon label. His fourth album Re-Dunn was released on January 10, 2020.

In 2019, Dunn was inducted into the Country Music Hall of Fame.

Early life
Dunn was born in Coleman, Texas, and attended 13 schools in his first 12 years of school. He began school in New Mexico and finished his formal education at Abilene Christian University in 1975 as a psychology major. While playing bass guitar and singing with bands in clubs in the Abilene, Texas, area, the university gave him the choice of either quitting the band or the university . He left the university, then moved to Tulsa, Oklahoma, for a chance at the country music scene. He lived there for many years while drawing much inspiration from local honky tonks such as Tulsa City Limits, prominently-featured in the music video for Brooks & Dunn's hit "Boot Scootin' Boogie". While in college, he served as a music and youth minister at Avoca Baptist Church in Avoca, Texas.

Musical career

Brooks & Dunn

Dunn began his musical career as a solo artist. He charted two minor singles with Churchill/MCA Records: in 1983, he released "It's Written All Over Your Face", and in 1984, "She Put the Sad in All His Songs". In 1990, he and Kix Brooks formed Brooks & Dunn. In 1991, they released their first album, Brand New Man, certified 6× platinum by the RIAA. Brooks & Dunn released 12 studio albums, two greatest hits albums, and a Christmas album.

Brooks & Dunn sold over 30 million albums, had twenty number-one singles on Billboard, and were one of the most-consistently successful acts on the concert circuit. In 2009, they announced they were temporarily disbanding in 2010.

On December 3, 2014, Brooks & Dunn reunited, and along with Reba McEntire, performed a series of concerts throughout the summer and fall of 2015.

2011–12: Debut solo album and departure from Sony

In late 2010, Dunn announced that he was working on a solo album. The album's first single, "Bleed Red", was released to country radio on January 29, 2011, and debuted at number 30 on the Billboard Hot Country Songs chart for the week ending February 19, 2011, and ended as a Top 10, his first of his solo career. Dunn's self-titled album Ronnie Dunn was released on June 7, 2011. The second single from the album, "Cost of Livin'", was released on June 6, 2011, and debuted at number 56 on the country chart. It peaked at number 19, followed by "Let the Cowboy Rock" at number 31.

The album debuted at number one on the Billboard Top Country Albums, as well as number 5 on the Billboard 200, selling 45,000 copies in its first week in the US.

In June 2012, Ronnie Dunn took to social media to ask his fans what the fourth single on the album should be. Shortly after, Ronnie got a call from the executives at Sony Music saying that his "fb post killed the "Let The Cowboy Rock" single. He then requested for radio to start playing "Once" as the next single. Before the song could be released to radio as a single, he was released from the label.

2013–14: Little Will-E Records and Peace, Love, and Country Music
In March 2013, Ronnie Dunn previewed the song "Country This" on SoundCloud. On June 4, 2013, Ronnie released the two new tracks, "Country This" and "Kiss You There", exclusively on iTunes. The songs were each previewed for a month on The Highway on Sirius XM.

On July 9, 2013, Dunn announced his new record deal, a joint effort between HitShop Records and his own label Little Will-E Records with HitShop executing radio promotion while Dunn retains personal brand control. The lead-off single for his second solo album, "Kiss You There", was released to country radio on July 29, 2013. After an unsuccessful run with "Kiss You There", Dunn and HitShop Records parted ways.

On November 19, 2013, Dunn released the second single from the forthcoming album, "Wish I Still Smoked Cigarettes". In January 2014 Dunn also released "Grown Damn Man" as a promotional single from the second solo album. The album, Peace, Love and Country Music, was released on April 8, 2014.

2014–2018: Nash Icon record deal and Tattooed Heart

On December 1, 2014, Ronnie Dunn began to speculate on his Facebook page that he had signed with the newest imprint of Big Machine Label Group, NASH Icon, but the label never confirmed nor denied. On January 12, 2015, President of Big Machine Scott Borchetta officially announced that Dunn had joined Reba McEntire and Martina McBride making him the third artist to join the roster. Borchetta stated in a press release "Ronnie Dunn has one of the smoothest, most-recognized and most-popular voices of the last twenty-five years in Country music. I'm truly honored to have him join us and take his rightful place as an Icon. Great music is on the way." Dunn also commented in the article saying "This is the best possible scenario that I can imagine. The Big Machine and Cumulus combination is a force, and I am proud to be included in this innovative venture". The press release went on to announce Ronnie Dunn was about to hit the studio to record what is now his third solo album and that the lead-off single of the album was released in early spring of 2015.

The lead single from Dunn's third solo album, "Ain't No Trucks in Texas", was released on July 17, 2015. On April 22, 2016, Dunn announced the second single, "Damn Drunk", on his Facebook page. The song was released August 5, 2016. On August 22, 2016, Dunn announced that the title of his upcoming third solo album will be Tattooed Heart and It released on November 11, 2016.

2019-Present: Reboot and Re-Dunn
In 2019, Brooks & Dunn returned to the studio for the first time since the release of their 2009 compilation, #1s… and Then Some. The result was a new album, Reboot, a collection of some of Brooks & Dunn's greatest hits re-recorded as duets between the duo and up-and-coming country music stars. The album was released on April 5, 2019. It debuted at No. 1 on Billboards Top Country Albums chart.

Dunn performed at the 2019 Musicians Hall of Fame and Museum Concert and Induction Ceremony.

Dunn announced in 2019 that he would be releasing a covers album in January 2020. Titled Re-Dunn, the album is a collection of twenty-four classic rock and country covers. A cover of "Amarillo by Morning" was released on September 6, 2019.

Personal life
Dunn married his wife, Janine, on May 19, 1990; the couple have three children.

Awards
Ronnie Dunn has 15 Grammy nominations, 24 Broadcast Music Incorporated (BMI) Million-Airplay awards, and was BMI Country Music Songwriter of the Year in 1996 and 2001. He has 27 ACM awards, winning Top Vocal Duo every year since 1991 except for 2000 (the honor went to Montgomery Gentry), and 2007 and 2009 (the honor went to Sugarland), including three Entertainer of the Year awards and vocal event of the year in 2005, for their hit "Building Bridges" with Vince Gill and Sheryl Crow's background vocals, along with his Single of the Year for his gospel song "Believe". He is a member of the Texas, Oklahoma and Arkansas Music Halls of Fame. Brooks and Dunn have more Country Music Association awards and Academy of Country Music awards than any act in the history of country music. Dunn was also the National Anthem singer before Game 3 of the 2011 World Series in Arlington, Texas.

Discography

Studio albums

Singles

Featured singles

Other appearances

Music videos

Awards and nominations

References

American country singer-songwriters
American male singer-songwriters
Abilene Christian University alumni
Grammy Award winners
Singer-songwriters from Louisiana
1953 births
Living people
People from Coleman, Texas
Texas Republicans
Brooks & Dunn members
MCA Records artists
Musicians from Tulsa, Oklahoma
Arista Nashville artists
Singer-songwriters from Texas
Singer-songwriters from Oklahoma
Country musicians from Texas
Country musicians from Louisiana
Country musicians from Oklahoma